The TRNC Coast Guard Command (Turkish: KKTC Sahil Güvenlik Komutanlığı) is responsible for defending the Turkish Republic of Northern Cyprus against any attack from the sea. This force was established in 1976. It is affiliated with the Security Forces Command. It is an armed law enforcement agency serving in the coastal areas of the Turkish Republic of Northern Cyprus. It is the only element of the Security Forces Command at sea.

See also 

 Cyprus Turkish Peace Force Command
 Directorate General for Police
 TRNC Special Task Force Command

External links 

 Official website (Turkish)

References

Military of Northern Cyprus